Edward "Ted" Potter (21 March 1878 – 22 May 1960) was an  Australian rules footballer who played with Geelong in the Victorian Football League (VFL).

Notes

External links 

1878 births
1960 deaths
Australian rules footballers from Victoria (Australia)
Geelong Football Club players